The Confederation of the Greens, frequently referred to as simply The Greens (LV), is a green political party in Spain. Since 2011, 13 out of 16 of their member parties belong to Equo; for this reason, on 13 May 2012, the European Green Party decided to withdraw the Confederation of the Greens membership.

Composition

Electoral performance

Cortes Generales

See also 
 Green party
 Green politics
 List of environmental organizations

Notes

External links 
Los Verdes
Historia Electoral
 Historia de Los Verdes de León

References

1984 establishments in Spain
European Green Party
Global Greens member parties
Green political parties in Spain
Political parties established in 1984
Political parties in Spain